The European Operations Management Association (EurOMA) is an international network of academics and practitioners from around the world who have a common interest in the continuing development of Operations Management. EurOMA is a European-based network with rapidly growing international links, whereby members can share their ideas, knowledge, and experience. It is a communication network that bridges the gap between research and practice. Together with its American- and Japan-based counterparts, the Production and Operations Management Society (POMS) and Japanese Operations Management and Strategy Association (JOMSA), EurOMA is working towards extending the arena of Operations Management throughout the world by bringing the professionals in the field closer together.

EurOMA places a key focus for development and application of knowledge; excellence in manufacturing and service operations must be led by the development of new knowledge. The Association provides such a focus for identifying and disseminating the latest thinking and research as well as for exploring current issues in OM, thereby setting research agendas for the future.  The International Annual EurOMA Conference is a major forum for the presentation of new ideas and developments in the field.

Furthermore, EurOMA aims to support education in Operations Management by promoting a wide range of academic activities designed to advance the teaching and learning of Operations Management, including workshops, seminars, summer schools and forums.

The current EurOMA president is Raffaella Cagliano of the Politecnico di Milano, who heads up the EurOMA board.

Origins
The Association was originally formed as a UK-based group (OMA) in 1984, and rapidly grew into Europe's leading professional association for Operations Management. The expanding European dimension led to the forming of the European Operations Management Association (EurOMA) in October 1993.  EurOMA is a professional non-profit association, and currently administered by EIASM, the European Institute for Advanced Studies in Management.

Activities
Annual conference: EurOMA hosts an annual conference that brings together Operations Management scholars from across the world. It also participates in joint events with its US partner organisation, the Production and Operations Management Society (POMS).
Publications: The official journal of EurOMA is the International Journal of Operations & Production Management (IJOPM), which provides a communication medium for all those working in the operations management field, whether they work in academic institutions, in industry or in consultancy.  The content of the journal focuses on topics which have a substantial management (as opposed to technical) content.
Education: EurOMA hosts many educational and training programs, including the EurOMA Summer School, the Annual Doctoral Workshop, and the Service Operations Management forum.
 Career development: EurOMA offers a placement service that advertises open positions to its members.

References

External links
 European Operations Management Association

Publications
The following academic journals are concerned with Operations Management issues:
 International Journal of Operations & Production Management, which is supported by the European Operations Management Association
 Journal of Operations Management
 Production and Operations Management

Management organizations